The 2008 Wichita State Shockers baseball team represented Wichita State University in the 2008 NCAA Division I baseball season. The Shockers played their home games at Eck Stadium under 31st year coach Gene Stephenson.

Previous season
The 2007 Wichita State Shockers baseball team finished the year 53-22 overall and 20–4 in the Missouri Valley Conference. The Shockers had their own Super Regional. In the first game, Wichita State would lose 6–7 to New Orleans. In the losers' bracket they would beat Oral Roberts 11–4, a rematch win against New Orleans 7–3, and would beat Arizona in the next two games 4-3, then 3–0 in the Regional Finals. In the Super Regionals, the Shockers would lose to UC Irvine 0-1, then 2–3.

2007 MLB Draft
The Shockers had ten players drafted in the 2007 MLB draft.

 Peter Kozma was expected to play for Wichita State, but was drafted and signed with the St. Louis Cardinals.
 Jon Gilmore was expected to play for Wichita State, but was drafted and signed with the Atlanta Braves.
 Derek Norris was expected to play for Wichita State, but was drafted and signed with the Washington Nationals.

Players in bold are signees drafted from high school, community colleges that will attend Wichita State or attendees that will stay for the 2008 season.

Roster

Schedule and results

Rankings

References

Wichita State
Wichita State Shockers baseball seasons
Wichita State Shockers
Wichita State
Missouri Valley Conference baseball champion seasons